Kerckhoff Dam is a concrete arch dam on the San Joaquin River in Fresno County, California, about  southwest of Big Creek. The dam and its  reservoir provide water for the Kerckhoff Powerhouses No. 1 and No. 2. Powerhouse No. 1 has three Francis turbines producing a maximum of 38 megawatts (MW) and Powerhouse No. 2 has a single Francis turbine rated at 155 MW for a total project capacity of 193 MW. An annual 579.1 million KWh of electricity are generated here.

Completed in 1920, the dam and Powerhouse No. 1 were the first to utilize the San Joaquin River for hydroelectricity. The second powerhouse was added in 1983.

The dam, named for William George Kerckhoff, was part of the "Big Creek Hydroelectric Project", the largest construction project in the world in 1910.

See also
Big Creek Hydroelectric Project
Crane Valley Project

References

Dams completed in 1920
Dams on the San Joaquin River
Dams in California
Arch dams
Pacific Gas and Electric Company dams
Hydroelectric power plants in California